Ronald Leslie Rooke (7 December 1911 – 9 June 1985) was an English footballer who played as a centre forward. During his three decades' playing career he scored at least 931 goals in 1029 official matches, among which more than 765 league goals at all levels. According to the RSSSF he is the best league goalscorer of all time, and the third overall behind Erwin Helmchen and Josef Bican.

Playing career
Rooke was born in Guildford, Surrey, and began his playing career with local club Guildford City. He then had a spell with Woking in 1932–33 during which he scored 29 goals from 16 appearances in all competitions. In 1933, he joined Crystal Palace, who were at the time in the Third Division South. He played mainly for the Palace reserve side, only playing eighteen league matches and scoring six goals between 1933 and 1936. He then moved to Second Division club Fulham for a £300 fee in November 1936. He was the club's leading scorer for three consecutive seasons and contributed all six goals in a 6–0 FA Cup demolition of Bury, which is still a club record.

He had scored 57 goals in 87 league matches for Fulham before the outbreak of the second world war. However, Rooke's career did not stop, serving as a physical training instructor in the RAF, enabled him to continue playing, where he made 199 appearances in the wartime games for Fulham, scoring 212 goals. He also won a Wartime International cap for England in 1942, against Wales. In 1945, Rooke had guested for Arsenal in a match against the touring Dynamo Moscow team. The resumption of league football in 1946 saw Rooke score a further 13 goals in 18 appearances for Fulham, before a surprising transfer to the first division strugglers Arsenal in December that year. Rooke left Fulham after scoring 70 goals in 105 league appearances for the club. Despite being 35 years old and never having played in the top flight, the Gunners paid £1,000 with two players, Cyril Grant and Dave Nelson moving to Craven Cottage.

However surprising the signing may have been, Rooke made an immediate impact: he scored the winner on his debut, against Charlton Athletic on 14 December 1946, and by the end of the season had taken his total to 21 goals from 24 league matches and helped Arsenal finish in mid-table. He scored 33 league goals in 1947–48, a total that made him that season's First Division top scorer, and helped propel the Gunners to their sixth League title. He remains Arsenal's all-time record-holder for the most goals scored in a postwar season. Rooke scored another 15 goals in 1948–49, including one in Arsenal's 4–3 victory over Manchester United in the 1948 FA Charity Shield. For the Gunners Rooke scored 70 goals in 94 matches in all competitions. 

In total he scored 170 goals from 256 appearances in the Football League for Crystal Palace, Fulham and Arsenal. His goal exploits continued in non-league football, becoming a player-manager for various clubs before his eventual retirement, ending a career that stretched over thirty years.

Managerial career
Rooke left Arsenal in the summer of 1949, to rejoin former club Crystal Palace as player-manager. His first season as manager was moderately successful as Palace finished seventh in the Third Division South. The next season began poorly, and in November 1950 he moved on to Bedford Town, having increased his appearances and goals totals for Palace to 63 and 32 respectively. He initially featured as a player for Bedford, before being appointed player-manager in February 1951, a job he held until December 1953. During this spell at the club Rooke scored 97 goals from 136 appearances in all competitions.

He then moved on to become player-manager at Haywards Heath Town and Addlestone, before returning to Bedford in 1959. Although his second spell saw him appointed only as a manager, he made two first team appearances when the club were lacking players. He was sacked after the club lost an FA Cup match against Hitchin Town in September 1961.

Personal life
Rooke later worked at Heathrow Airport and Whitbread brewery. He died of lung cancer in June 1985.

Honours

As player
Arsenal
First Division: 1947–48
FA Charity Shield: 1948

As manager
Bedford Town
 Huntingdonshire Premier Cup: 1951–52

Individual
 First Division top scorer: 1947–48
 Daily Express Footballer of the Season: 1947–48

See also 
 List of men's footballers with the most official appearances
 List of men's footballers with 500 or more goals

References 

1911 births
Military personnel from Guildford
Sportspeople from Guildford
1985 deaths
English footballers
England wartime international footballers
Association football forwards
Guildford City F.C. players
Woking F.C. players
Crystal Palace F.C. players
Fulham F.C. players
Arsenal F.C. players
Crystal Palace F.C. managers
Bedford Town F.C. players
Haywards Heath Town F.C. players
Addlestone & Weybridge Town F.C. players
Southern Football League players
English Football League players
First Division/Premier League top scorers
English football managers
Bedford Town F.C. managers
Haywards Heath Town F.C. managers
Addlestone & Weybridge Town F.C. managers
Southern Football League managers
Deaths from lung cancer in England
Footballers from Surrey
Royal Air Force personnel of World War II
Royal Air Force Physical Training instructors